Thomas Wilde may refer to:
 Thomas Wilde, 1st Baron Truro, British lawyer, judge and politician
 Thomas Wilde, 3rd Baron Truro, English cricketer and barrister